Paradidymocentrus is a genus of beetles in the family Cerambycidae, containing the following species:

 Paradidymocentrus maindroni Breuning, 1978
 Paradidymocentrus parterufipennis Breuning, 1956

References

Acanthocinini